Windy Pass (el. 6507 ft.) is a mountain pass in the Cascade Mountains in Washington. It is in the Alpine Lakes Wilderness area.

Mountain passes of Washington (state)